Songjianghe (Chinese: 松江河镇) is a town in situated in the Changbai Mountains of Fusong County, Baishan, Fusong County, China. The population of Songjianghe was 54,986 in 2010: 27,858 males and 27,128 females; of which, 5,984 were under 15, 42,479 were between 15 and 64 years old and 6,523 were over 64 years old. Major roads in the town include the prefecture-level highway X097 and the province-level highway G504 and the town has an airport and a railway station. The town has 13 village-level divisions, 7 'communities' and 6 villages.

References 

Fusong County
Township-level divisions of Jilin